Klepp Station is a railway station in the municipality of Klepp in Rogaland county, Norway. The station on the Sørlandet Line. The station is served by the Jæren Commuter Rail between Stavanger and Egersund.

References

Railway stations on the Sørlandet Line
Railway stations in Rogaland
Railway stations opened in 1878
1878 establishments in Norway
Klepp